The Monument to the Mersey Tunnel stands in Chester Street, Birkenhead, Wirral, Merseyside, England, near the western entrance to the Queensway Tunnel, one of the two Mersey Tunnels carrying roads under the River Mersey between Liverpool and the Wirral.  It consists of shaft with a light on the top, and originally had the dual purpose of being a monument and of illuminating the entrance to the tunnel.  It was designed by Herbert James Rowse, and was one of a pair, but the monument that was on the Liverpool side of the River Mersey no longer exists.  The monument is recorded in the National Heritage List for England as a designated Grade II listed building.

History

Queensway Tunnel, the first road tunnel under the River Mersey linking Liverpool with the Wirral, was built between 1925 and 1933.  Two identical structures were designed by Herbert James Rowse to be placed near the entrances to the tunnel, one on each side of the River Mersey.  They had two purposes, both to act as monuments, and to illuminate the area around the entrances to the tunnels.  Their design was approved in June 1933, and this was exhibited at the Royal Academy Exhibition in 1934.  The monuments were built by McAlpine and Sons, and the decorative metal work was carried out by H. J. Lloyd of H. H. Martyn and Son of Chester.  The construction of the monuments was complete by the date of the official opening of the tunnel by King George V on 18 July 1934.  The Birkenhead entrance to the tunnel was redesigned in the 1960s, and the monument was moved to its present position between carriageways.  The monument on the Liverpool side no longer exists.

Description

The monument stands on a white ashlar base. The core of the shaft is reinforced concrete, which is overlaid with fluted and polished black granite. The lighting bowl is in gilded bronze and glass. The shaft tapers, and is also slightly curved "to correct the optical illusion of being less in diameter in the centre than at the top of the shaft". There are two bands around the shaft decorated with chevrons and acanthus. At the top of the shaft is a fluted glass bowl. Arising from this is a ribbed cap bearing a spherical-shaped lamp. On the base of the shaft is an inscription reading as follows.

Also inscribed on the base of the shaft are names of members and officers of the Mersey Tunnel Joint Committee, and the engineers, contractors, architect, and valuer who were responsible for the tunnel.

Appraisal

The monument was designated a Grade II listed building on 10 August 1992. Grade II is the lowest of the three grades of listing and is applied to "buildings of national importance and special interest".  The National Recording Project comments that it now "merely serves as a memorial".

See also

Listed buildings in Birkenhead

References

Citations

Sources
Hartwell, Clare; Hyde, Matthew; Hubbard, Edward; Pevsner, Nikolaus: The Buildings of England: Cheshire (1971: reprinted 2011) Yale University Press New Haven and London 
Morris, Edward;  Roberts, Emma: Public Sculpture of Britain, vol.15: Public Sculpture of Cheshire and Merseyside (excluding Liverpool) (2012) Liverpool University Press, Liverpool 

Historic England Listed Buildings retrieved 3 April 2015
Mersey Tunnel Users Association History; retrieved 16 January 2014
National Recording Project Column - Queensway Tunnel; retrieved 16 January 2014

Buildings and structures in Birkenhead
Grade II listed buildings in Merseyside
Buildings and structures completed in 1934
Tunnels in Merseyside
Grade II listed monuments and memorials
1934 sculptures
1934 establishments in England